{{DISPLAYTITLE:C9H8O3}}
The molecular formula C9H8O3 (molar mass : 164.16 g/mol, exact mass : 164.047344) may refer to:

 Caffeic aldehyde, a phenolic aldehyde contained in the seeds of Phytolacca americana
 Coumaric acids
 o-Coumaric acid
 p-Coumaric acid
 m-Coumaric acid
 Phenylpyruvic acid
 Diformylcresol